Cowden is a small village and civil parish in the Sevenoaks District of Kent, England.

Cowden may also refer to:
 Cowden, East Riding of Yorkshire, England
 Great Cowden, East Riding of Yorkshire
 Cowden, Illinois, United States
 Cowden railway station, a railway station in Kent

People with the given name Cowden
 Charles Cowden Clarke (1787–1877), English author
 Mary Cowden Clarke (1809–1898), English author

People with the surname Cowden
 Bill Cowden (1920–2007), American basketball player
 John Cowden (1917–2006), American television executive
 Lucinda Cowden (born 1965), Australian actress

See also
 
 Cowden Park House
 Cowden syndrome
 Cowden v. Commissioner, a case in the 1961 United States Court of Appeals

English given names